Roland Claus (born 18 December 1954 in Hettstedt, Saxony-Anhalt) is a German politician and member of "die Linke."

1954 births
Living people
People from Mansfeld-Südharz
Socialist Unity Party of Germany politicians
Party of Democratic Socialism (Germany) politicians
Members of the Bundestag for Saxony-Anhalt
People of the Stasi
Members of the Bundestag 2013–2017
Members of the Bundestag 2009–2013
Members of the Bundestag 2005–2009
Members of the Bundestag 1998–2002
Members of the Bundestag for The Left